The Two Orphans (Spanish:Las dos huerfanitas) is a 1950 Mexican drama film directed by Roberto Rodríguez and starring Evita Muñoz, María Eugenia Llamas and Joaquín Cordero. It is an adaptation of the play The Two Orphans by Adolphe d'Ennery and Eugène Cormon.

Cast
 Evita Muñoz as Elvira Pérez  
 María Eugenia Llamas as Teresita 
 Joaquín Cordero as Morete  
 Freddy Fernandez as Avispa  
 Miguel Córcega as Arturo  
 Miguel Manzano as don Alfonso  
 Nicolás Rodríguez as Doctor  
 Silvia Derbez as Mascotita  
 Domingo Soler as Tío de Teresita
 Luis Badillo as Matias, cantinero 
 Victorio Blanco as Policía 
 Guillermo Bravo Sosa
 Lupe Carriles as Vendedora de frutas  
 Edmundo Espino as Boticario 
 Magdalena Estrada as Vendedora de flores  
 Leonor Gómez as Juana  
 Ángel Infante as Empleado hospital

External links 
 

1950 films
1950 drama films
Mexican drama films
1950s Spanish-language films
Films directed by Roberto Rodríguez
Mexican films based on plays
Mexican black-and-white films
1950s Mexican films